Feel It is the third album by American soul/R&B vocal group, Black Ivory. The album was produced by Robert John, Mike Gately and Black Ivory and released in June 1975 on Buddah Records.

Album information
After the success of Black Ivory's first two albums (both released in 1972 on Today/Perception Records), Don't Turn Around and Baby Won't You Change Your Mind, the group took a three-year break from recording. During that time Black Ivory toured, and changed their management and record company. Now signed to Buddah Records, Black Ivory's first album on the new label entitled, Feel It was produced by Black Ivory (Leroy Burgess, Stuart Bascombe and Russell Patterson), Robert John and Mike Gately. It was recorded in New York City at Bell Sound Studios, Opal Sound Studios, and Mediasound Studios and released in June 1975. The album produced four singles. The first and only single to chart was a top 40 R&B Billboard hit entitled "Will We Ever Come Together", which was released in December 1974 and appeared on the Billboard soul/R&B singles chart for 13 weeks peaking at No. 40 on April 12, 1975.

Critical reception 
Andrew Hamilton reviewed the album on AllMusic and described it as "Good or better than the previous two. Heavy on ballads, this offering contains three sides written by group members. The cream, however, is John & Gately's 'Will We Ever Come Together,' a vastly underrated ballad".

Track listing

Personnel
Black Ivory
Leroy Burgess - vocals 
Stuart Bascombe - vocals 
Russell Patterson – Vocals
with:
Greg McCray, Jonathan Cobert, Greg Minniefield, Eugene Lemon, Michael Gately, Leroy Burgess - keyboards
William Dogan, Clif Nivison, Angel Reca - acoustic and electric guitar
James Calloway - bass
Charles Pedro, Dennis Allen - drums
Charles Pedro, Raymond Ellington, Russell Patterson, Stuart Bascombe - percussion

Production
Producers – Bascombe, Burgess, Patterson, Robert John, Michael Gately 
Arranged by Leonard Adams
Horn and string arrangements – Patrick Adams, Charles Calello
Keyboard arrangements – Leroy Burgess
Vocal arrangements – Black Ivory

References

1975 albums
Black Ivory albums
Albums arranged by Charles Calello
Buddah Records albums